Shuyang is a town situated in Xianghe County, Langfang, Hebei, China. Shuyang serves as the administrative center of Xianghe County. According to the 2010 Chinese Census, Shuyang's population is 103,659.

History 
In 1956, the area was incorporated as Chengguan Township. In 1958, Chengguan became a people's commune. In 1983, Chengguan People's Commune was replaced by the town of Shuyang.

In 1996, the former townships of Jinxinzhuang and Daluo were merged into Shuyang.

Geography 
Shuyang is located in the western portion of central Xianghe County, along the southern banks of the Chaobai River.

Administrative divisions 
Shuyang administers 19 residential communities and 52 administrative villages.

Demographics 

According to the 2010 Chinese Census, Shuyang's population was 103,659. A 2002 estimate put Shuyang's population at about 64,900. Shuyang's population in 2000 was 67,660, per the 2000 Chinese Census. A 1997 estimate put Shuyang's population at about 59,000.

Transportation 
The Tongtang Highway passes through Shuyang.

See also
List of township-level divisions of Hebei

References

Township-level divisions of Hebei